The president of the Parliamentary Assembly of the Council of Europe is the head of the Parliamentary Assembly of the Council of Europe (PACE): the deliberative consultative body of the Council of Europe.

References

Presidents
PACE